Eois rectifasciata is a moth in the family Geometridae. It was described by David Stephen Fletcher in 1958. It is found in Uganda.

References

Moths described in 1958
Eois
Moths of Africa